Events from the year 1864 in Japan.

Incumbents
Emperor: Kōmei

Events

August 20 - Kinmon incident

Births
October 8 – Kikunae Ikeda, chemist (d. 1936)

Deaths

References

 
1860s in Japan
Years of the 19th century in Japan